Črečan   is a village in northern Croatia, part of the Nedelišće municipality within Međimurje County.

History

Črečan is first time mentioned in charter issued in year 1478 as Chereczan.

Catholic Chapel in Črečan was built in the year 1901.

Geography

Črečan is about 10 kilometres west from the centre of Čakovec, and some 90 kilometres north of Zagreb.

Črečan is situated in the alluvial plane of river Drava, at the edge of low hills called Međimurske Gorice.

Demographics

Črečan had a population of 434 in 2011 census.

References

Populated places in Međimurje County